is a public co-educational senior high school located in Kawagoe City, Saitama Prefecture, Japan.

The school is the oldest high school in Saitama Prefecture and has both full-day and part-time courses. Its alumni include the "Father of the Walkman", former President of Sony China Shizuo Takashino. In 2015 students of the school set a Guinness World Record for the "longest distance traveled by a vehicle on a railway track powered by dry cell batteries".

History 
The school officially opened on 29 April 1908 with capacity for 100 students in its dyeing and weaving course. A design course was subsequently added in 1912.

A two-year preparatory course was established in April 1919 with capacity for 80 students, however it was abolished in 1921. A the same time, the regular courses became five years in length and an elective course was established.

Applied chemistry and architecture courses were added in 1941 and 1942 respectively, increasing the school's total enrolment to 470. The school's current name was adopted in April 1948.

In April 1987 the textile engineering course was renamed as the textile design course and became coeducational. In April 1991 the industrial chemistry, architecture, mechanical and electrical courses also became coeducational.

On 3 November 2015 students from the school, in collaboration with Panasonic, set a Guinness World Record for the "longest distance traveled by a vehicle on a railway track powered by dry cell batteries". A train weighing more than one ton was powered by 600 dry cell batteries and travelled a distance of 22.6 km along the Chokaisanroku Line in Akita Prefecture.

Notable alumni
Seijuro Arafune – politician and former Minister of Transport
Makoto Hirayama – politician in the national Diet
Masahiko Ishida – former professional baseball pitcher for the Chiba Lotte Marines
Hidenori Kosaka – former professional baseball pitcher for the Yomiuri Giants
Sakan Morita – former professional baseball pitcher for the Taiyo Whales
Masahiro Nojima – former baseball infielder who represented Japan at the 1996 Summer Olympics
Takeshi Sato – former professional baseball pitcher for the Hiroshima Carp and Yakult Swallows
Akio Shiibashi – developer of the Suica IC card used by the East Japan Railway Company
Shizuo Takashino – Sony executive known as the "Father of the Walkman
Keiichi Tanaka – mayor of Warabi, Saitama from 1975 until 2007

References

External links 
 

Education in Saitama Prefecture
1908 establishments in Japan
Educational institutions established in 1908